Llanrhyddlad is a hamlet in Anglesey, in north-west Wales. in the community of Cylch-y-Garn.

References

Villages in Anglesey
Cylch-y-Garn